Gordon McRorie (born 12 May 1988) is a rugby union scrumhalf who plays for AS rugby Milano  and  Canada.
McRorie made his debut for Canada in 2014 and was part of the Canada squad at the 2015 Rugby World Cup.

Early life 
McRorie was born in Stirlingshire, Scotland and attended Stirling University.

References

External links

Living people
1988 births
Canadian rugby union players
Canada international rugby union players
Prairie Wolf Pack players
Rugby union scrum-halves
Toronto Arrows players